The General Secretary and Secretary of the Workers' Party of Korea is a member of the Secretariat of the Workers' Party of Korea, which is headed by a General Secretary (the name of this office has changed throughout North Korean history).

General Secretaries and forerunners

Secretaries

Noter

References

Footnotes

Bibliography

Books:
 
  
 
Journal articles:
 

Members of the Secretariat of the Workers' Party of Korea